Yusup Batirmurzaev (born 13 April 1996) is a Kazakhstani freestyle wrestler. He won the gold medal in the men's 125 kg event at the 2020 Asian Wrestling Championships held in New Delhi, India. He represented Kazakhstan at the 2020 Summer Olympics in Tokyo, Japan.

Career 

In 2019, he won one of the bronze medals in the men's 125 kg event at the World U23 Wrestling Championship in Budapest, Hungary. In 2021, he won one of the bronze medals in the men's 125 kg event at the 2021 Waclaw Ziolkowski Memorial held in Warsaw, Poland.

A few months later, he competed in the men's 125 kg event at the 2020 Summer Olympics in Tokyo, Japan where he was eliminated in his first match by Gennadij Cudinovic of Germany.

In 2022, he won one of the bronze medals in his event at the Yasar Dogu Tournament held in Istanbul, Turkey.

Achievements

References

External links 
 
 
 

1996 births
Living people
Kazakhstani male sport wrestlers
Asian Wrestling Championships medalists
Olympic wrestlers of Kazakhstan
Wrestlers at the 2020 Summer Olympics
Place of birth missing (living people)
21st-century Kazakhstani people